3′-Hydroxyechinenone is a keto-carotenoid pigment found in cyanobacteria and microalgae. Carotenoids belong to a larger class of phytochemicals known as terpenoids. The chemical formula of canthaxanthin is C40H54O2.  It is found non-covalently bound in the orange carotenoid protein (OCP), which is a soluble protein involved in photoprotection and non-photochemical quenching of photosynthesis.

References

Carotenoids
Cyclohexenes